Do or Die is the third studio album by American rapper and producer Ant Banks.

Track listing 
"Do Or Die"
"Keep 'Em Guessin'"
"It Ain't No Thang"
"Sound Of Lead" (featuring Spice 1 and 187 Fac)
"I Think I Wanna Die (Losin' It)"
"Money Don't Make a Man" (featuring MC Breed)
"You Ain't Knowin'"
"Hi-Speed Anthem"
"No Time Fa BS"
"Gafflin' Season"
"Bay Area Massacre" (featuring Mr. Ill, Rappin' Ron, Gangsta P & Jock)
"Smokestrumental"

Chart history

References 

Ant Banks albums
1995 albums
Albums produced by Ant Banks
Jive Records albums